Geisha is an erotic adventure video game developed by Coktel Vision and MDO and published by Tomahawk in 1990 for Amiga, Atari ST, and DOS. The game uses a point-and-click interface, and includes several minigames including a card game and an action sequence.

Plot
A mad scientist kidnaps the player's girlfriend Eva, and wants to transform her into a futuristic geisha. The player travels to Japan to prevent this from happening.

Reception
Joystick praised the game's original design, while Generation 4 felt the game's graphical quality was unexceptional. Tilt described Geisha as a children's game for adults due to its simple gameplay and mature themes. Amiga Power questioned whether it was the worst full-price game the magazine had ever reviewed, while also commenting that the title was as "user-friendly and sexy as a rotten anchovy".

References

Further reading

External links
 Amiga Joker review
 DOSBox emulation

1990 video games
Erotic video games
Adventure games
Video games set in Japan
Atari ST games
DOS games
ScummVM-supported games
Video games developed in France
Works about geisha